The 1989 education summit, also known as the Charlottesville educational summit, was a meeting between President George H. W. Bush and 49 of the 50 governors of the United States to discuss national education policy.

Background 
Concerns arose in the late 1970s and early 1980s that American education policy was insufficient. While test scores remained relatively stable and most parents approved of local schools, policymakers feared that a lack of standards-based education policy was weakening the economy and preventing the United States from competing internationally. The Department of Education formed the National Commission on Excellence in Education in 1981, and it produced its report, A Nation at Risk, in 1983. The report was heavily critical of the state of education in the United States, and it prompted further concern for American education policy. A wave of state level education reforms took place in the 1980s. State governors were regarded as the leaders of school reform efforts in the late 1980s, as education was primarily legislated at the state level. The National Governors Association made education policy a priority, and it promoted the creation of national education standards and monitoring.

While campaigning for the Republican nomination in 1988, Bush expressed a desire to be "the education president". After winning the 1988 presidential election, Bush met with state governors, and an agreement was made to pursue a meeting on education policy. Bush met privately with 13 governors in May 1989, and the proposal of an education summit was positively received. Bush announced the summit at a National Governors Association meeting in July 1989. On September 13, the National Governors Association met with 40 representatives from various advocacy organizations. Governors Bill Clinton and Carroll A. Campbell Jr. led preparations for the summit.

Summit 
The summit took place at the University of Virginia in Charlottesville, Virginia, from September 27 to 28, 1989. It was attended by 49 of 50 states governors, with only Governor Rudy Perpich of Minnesota absent. In addition to President Bush, the summit was generally overseen by Governor Clinton in his role as Chairman of the National Governors Association and by Roger B. Porter in his role as Director of the Domestic Policy Council. The summit was split into six working groups, focusing on teaching, the learning environment, governance, choice and restructuring, competitive workforce and life-long learning, and post-secondary education, respectively. A joint statement by Bush and the governors was released at the end of the summit on September 28.

The summit resulted in six educational goals to be addressed by state governments and the federal government. The goals were designed to be highly aspirational with the expectation that it would prompt stronger governmental action to achieve them. President Bush announced these goals during the 1990 State of the Union Address.

 By the year 2000, all children will start school ready to learn.
 By the year 2000, the high school graduation rate will increase to at least 90 percent.
 By the year 2000, American students will leave grades 4, 8, and 12 having demonstrated competency in challenging subject matter, including English, mathematics, science, history, and geography, and every school in America will ensure that all students learn to use their minds well, so they may be prepared for responsible citizenship, further learning, and productive employment in our modern economy.
 By the year 2000, U.S. students will be first in the world in mathematics and science achievement.
 By the year 2000, every adult American will be literate and will possess the skills necessary to compete in a global economy and exercise the rights and responsibilities of citizenship.
 By the year 2000, every school in America will be free of drugs and violence and will offer a disciplined learning environment conducive to learning.

Aftermath 
The summit was celebrated as a major accomplishment in federal-state cooperation and in bipartisanship, though disagreements persisted after the summit regarding how to create the framework to meet the established goals. The policy goals reached during the summit would influence national education policy for decades. Bush proposed the America 2000 plan to address the summit's education goals, but it was not passed by Congress. The Clinton administration developed the Goals 2000 plan based on America 2000. Congress passed this plan, as well as the Improving America's Schools Act of 1994. The No Child Left Behind Act further built on the standards-based education policy goals developed during the summit and was passed in 2002.

Between 1992 and 2017, significant progress had been made for African American and Hispanic American students. In 1992, 78% of African American eighth-graders scored below basic in math, and by 2017 this number was reduced to 53%.

References

Bibliography 

 

1989 in American politics
1989 in Virginia
Education policy in the United States
History of education in the United States
Presidency of George H. W. Bush
September 1989 events in the United States